Grabówek  is a district of Gdynia, Poland, located in the central part of the city.

The Gdynia Maritime University is based in Grabówek.

Grabówek was once a possession of the Carthusian Monastery in Kartuzy, administratively located in the Puck County in the Pomeranian Voivodeship of the Kingdom of Poland.

During the German occupation of Poland in World War II, it was the location of an Einsatzgruppen-operated penal camp.

References

Districts of Gdynia